Léa Hélène Seydoux-Fornier de Clausonne (born 1 July 1985) is a French actor. Known for her roles in both French cinema and in Hollywood she has received various accolades including five César Award nominations, the Cannes Film Festival's Trophée Chopard in 2009, as well as a nomination for the 
BAFTA Rising Star Award in 2014. In 2016, Seydoux was honoured with the Chevalier of the Order of Arts and Letters. In 2022, the French government made her an Officer of the Legion of Honour.

She began her acting career with her film debut in Girlfriends (2006) with early roles in The Last Mistress (2007) and On War (2008). She won acclaim for her French roles in The Beautiful Person (2008), Belle Épine (2010), and Farewell, My Queen (2012). During this time she expanded her career appearing in minor roles in high-profile Hollywood films, including Quentin Tarantino's Inglourious Basterds (2009), Ridley Scott's Robin Hood (2010), Woody Allen's Midnight in Paris (2011) and the action film Mission: Impossible – Ghost Protocol (2011).

Her breakthrough role came with the controversial and acclaimed film Blue Is the Warmest Colour (2013) for which she received the Palme d'Or at the Cannes Film Festival along with her co-star Adèle Exarchopoulos. She received the Lumières Award for Best Actress for the film Grand Central (2014). She gained international attention for her role as Bond girl Madeleine Swann in Spectre (2015), and No Time to Die (2021).

She has appeared in the Wes Anderson films The Grand Budapest Hotel (2014) and The French Dispatch (2021). Other notable roles include Beauty and the Beast (2014), Saint Laurent (2014). The Lobster (2015), France (2021), Crimes of the Future (2022), and One Fine Morning (2022).

Seydoux is also known for her work as a model. She has been showcased in Vogue Paris, American Vogue, L'Officiel, Another Magazine and W magazine among others. Since 2016, she has been a brand ambassador for Louis Vuitton.

Early life
Born on 1 July 1985, Seydoux is the daughter of businessman  and Valérie Schlumberger. She was born in Passy, in the 16th arrondissement of Paris, and grew up in Saint-Germain-des-Prés in the 6th arrondissement. She had a strict Protestant upbringing, but she is not religious. Seydoux is one of seven children. She has three older half-siblings (Marine Bramly, Noé Saglio and Ondine Saglio) from her mother's first marriage, an older sister, stylist Camille Seydoux from her parents' marriage, and a further two paternal half-brothers, Ismaël Seydoux and Omer Seydoux, from her father's marriage to model Farida Khelfa.

Seydoux's parents are both partly of Alsatian descent. Her father is a great-grandson of businessman and inventor Marcel Schlumberger, while her mother is a granddaughter of Marcel's brother, Maurice Schlumberger. The family name came to exist in 1902, when Seydoux's great-great-grandfather Charles-Louis-Auguste-Jacques Seydoux (1870–1929) married Mathilde, daughter of Languedoc aristocrat François Fornier de Clausonne de Lédenon, whose family held the titles of Baron de Lédenon and seigneur de Clausonne, de Laugnac et de la Bastide d'Albe. The Seydoux family is widely known in France and influential in the movie industry. Her grandfather, Jérôme Seydoux, is the chairman of Pathé; her granduncle, Nicolas Seydoux, is the chairman of Gaumont Film Company; her other granduncle, Michel Seydoux, also a cinema producer, is the chairman of the Lille-based football club Lille OSC; and her father is the founder and CEO of the French wireless company Parrot. She has stated that her family initially took no interest in her film career and did not help her, and that she and her influential grandfather were not close. As a child, she had no desire to act. She instead wanted to be an opera singer, studying music at the Conservatoire de Paris.

Seydoux's parents divorced when she was three years old and they were often away, her mother in Africa and her father on business, which, combined with her large family, meant that she "felt lost in the crowd... I was very lonely as a kid. Really I always had the feeling I was an orphan." Through her family involvement in media and entertainment, Seydoux grew up acquainted with prominent artists such as photographer Nan Goldin, musicians Lou Reed and Mick Jagger and footwear designer Christian Louboutin. For six years, Seydoux went to summer camp in the United States, at the behest of her father, who wanted her to learn to speak English.

Her mother Valérie Schlumberger is a former actress-turned-philanthropist and the founder of the boutique Compagnie d'Afrique du Sénégal et de l'Afrique de l'ouest (CSAO), which promotes the work of African artists. Seydoux once worked as a model for their jewellery line Jokko. Schlumberger, who lived in Senegal as a teenager, is also the founder of the charitable organisations Association pour le Sénégal et l'Afrique de l'Ouest (ASAO) and Empire des enfants, a centre for homeless children in Dakar, of which Seydoux is the "godmother".

Seydoux describes her youthful self as short-haired, slightly dishevelled, and widely viewed as a bit strange: "People liked me, but I always felt like a misfit." Still concerned for her shyness in adulthood, Seydoux has admitted to having had an anxiety crisis during the 2009 Cannes Film Festival.

Career

2005–2007: Career beginnings
Seydoux says that as a child she wanted to become an opera singer, studying music at the Conservatoire de Paris, but eventually her shyness compelled her to drop the idea. It was not until the age of eighteen that she decided to become an actress. One of her friends was an actor, and Seydoux has said: "I found his life wonderful, I thought, 'Oh my god, you can travel, you're free, you can do what you want, you're the boss.'" She fell in love with an actor and decided to become an actress to impress him. She took acting classes at French drama school Les Enfants Terribles, and in 2007 she took further training at New York's Actors Studio with Corinne Blue.

In 2005, Seydoux appeared in the music video for Raphaël's single "Ne partons pas fâchés". The following year, Seydoux played her first major screen role as one of the main characters in Sylvie Ayme's Girlfriends (Mes copines). She starred in Nicolas Klotz's short film La Consolation, which was exhibited at the 2007 Cannes Film Festival.

In these years, she also did her first work as a model for American Apparel, posing for their Pantytime campaign, and had a role in the films 13 French Street and The Last Mistress.

2008–2012: French cinema and Hollywood expansion

Seydoux came to widespread attention in 2008, when she appeared in Christophe Honoré's The Beautiful Person, a role that earned her the 2009 Chopard Award at the Cannes Film Festival for "Best Upcoming Actress" and a César Award nomination for Most Promising Actress.

In 2009, she had a major part in Jessica Hausner's Lourdes, and a small role in her first Hollywood film, Quentin Tarantino's Inglourious Basterds. In 2010 she starred alongside Russell Crowe in Ridley Scott's Robin Hood, playing Isabella of Angoulême. That same year she appeared in Louis Garrel's Petit Tailleur, Rebecca Zlotowski's Belle Épine, which earned her a second César nomination of Most Promising Actress, and Raúl Ruiz's Mysteries of Lisbon. Seydoux auditioned to play Lisbeth Salander in The Girl With the Dragon Tattoo, but the part ultimately went to actress Rooney Mara. Seydoux recalled in an interview: "I got upset, but I don't think I'd be able to do anything to get that part. It was totally against my nature. I worked hard, but Lisbeth was almost anorexic. I wasn't like that".

In 2011, she played Gabrielle in the romantic comedy Midnight in Paris. She later participated in another Hollywood production, Mission: Impossible – Ghost Protocol, in which she played the assassin Sabine Moreau alongside stars Tom Cruise and Jeremy Renner. She also played Elle in the short film Time Doesn't Stand Still by Benjamin Millepied and Asa Mader . After Mission: Impossible, Seydoux returned to French cinema, starring in My Wife's Romance (Le Roman de ma femme) and Roses à crédit.

In 2012, she starred in Farewell, My Queen. The film opened the 62nd Berlin International Film Festival where it was met with critical acclaim. Critics praised director Benoît Jacquot's decision to cast Seydoux in the key role of Sidonie, stating "her luminous but watchful eyes suggest a soul wise beyond her years." Kenneth Turan of the Los Angeles Times wrote that Seydoux was an excellent choice for the part calling her a remarkably versatile young actress and pointed to the stark difference in her characters from her previous roles in Midnight in Paris and Mission: Impossible. That same year she appeared in the Swiss drama film, Sister. The film competed in competition at the 62nd Berlin International Film Festival, where it won the Special Award, the Silver Bear, and was selected as the Swiss entry for the Best Foreign Language Oscar at the 85th Academy Awards. Critics again praised Seydoux for bringing a strong array of emotions to a highly unsympathetic part and called her performance intensely moving. That year, Seydoux also filmed Blue Is the Warmest Colour by Abdellatif Kechiche, and Grand Central by Rebecca Zlotowski, both exhibited at the 66th Cannes Film Festival.

2013–2018: Blue Is the Warmest Colour and critical acclaim 

In 2013, Seydoux was nominated for Best Actress at the 38th César Awards for her role as Sidonie Laborde in Benoît Jacquot's Farewell, My Queen. Later that year at Cannes, Blue Is the Warmest Colour won the Palme d'Or and the jury, headed by Steven Spielberg, took the unusual move of awarding the prize not just to the director Abdellatif Kechiche, but also to the film's two stars, Seydoux and Adèle Exarchopoulos.

In 2014, Seydoux won the Best Actress award at the 19th Lumières Awards for her role in Blue Is the Warmest Colour and Grand Central. She was also nominated for the BAFTA Rising Star Award and the César Award for Best Actress in the same year. Her role in Blue Is the Warmest Colour earned her rave reviews, numerous accolades and international attention.

Seydoux co-starred with Vincent Cassel in Beauty and the Beast, a Franco-German romantic fantasy film directed by Christophe Gans. Her other 2014 films were The Grand Budapest Hotel, a Wes Anderson film in which she played Clotilde; and Bertrand Bonello's Saint Laurent, in which she played the role of the titular designer's muse Loulou de la Falaise.

In 2015, Seydoux starred with Vincent Lindon in Diary of a Chambermaid, a period piece based on Octave Mirbeau's novel Le Journal d'une femme de chambre. The film, whose script was written specifically for Seydoux, marked her second collaboration with Benoît Jacquot, following the 2012 film Farewell, My Queen. Although the film was screened in competition at the 65th Berlin International Film Festival to mixed reviews, critics were generally receptive to Seydoux's performance. Peter Bradshaw of The Guardian said that it was "a fine central performance from Seydoux", while critic Jordan Mintzer wrote that her performance is "robust and engaging throughout [the film]".

Seydoux appeared alongside Colin Farrell and Rachel Weisz in Yorgos Lanthimos's English-language debut The Lobster (2015), in which she played the ruthless leader of a group of rebels, the loners, who live in the woods. The film had its premiere at the 2015 Cannes Film Festival where it won the Jury Prize. She also appears as Madeleine Swann, the Bond girl in the 2015 film Spectre, the 24th James Bond film.

In 2016, Minister of Culture Fleur Pellerin made her a Knight of the Order of Arts and Letters (Ordre des Arts et des Lettres). Seydoux later appeared in Xavier Dolan's It's Only the End of the World, based on Jean-Luc Lagarce's play Juste la fin du monde.

In 2018, Seydoux co-starred alongside Ewan McGregor in Zoe, a sci-fi romance by Drake Doremus. The film had its world premiere at the Tribeca Film Festival on 21 April. She also appeared in Thomas Vinterberg's Kursk, a drama film about the 2000 Kursk submarine disaster. In May 2018, she served as a member of the jury at the 71st Cannes Film Festival. She was also invited to join the Academy of Motion Picture Arts and Sciences within the same year.

2019–present 

Seydoux stars in Hideo Kojima's video game Death Stranding. She provided the voice, performance and her likeness to the character Fragile, the head of Fragile Express. Death Stranding released in November 2019 to positive reviews in which critics called her a "marvel", and described her performance as being among some of the "most nuanced performance capture ever seen in the medium". She will also star in the game's sequel. She also appeared in Oh Mercy!, a French crime drama by director Arnaud Desplechin. The film premiered at Cannes and was selected to compete for the Palme d'Or. In 2021, Seydoux reprised her role as Madeleine Swann in the James Bond film No Time to Die. The film's release was postponed worldwide due to the COVID-19 pandemic. She stars in Wes Anderson's ensemble comedy-drama The French Dispatch (2021). She plays Lizzy in Ildikó Enyedi's The Story of My Wife (2021), and stars in the film France (2021) by Bruno Dumont. Seydoux collaborated with Arnaud Desplechin for the second time on Deception (2021).

In September 2020, it was announced that Seydoux would be starring in Mia Hansen-Løve's film One Fine Morning. In January 2021, it was announced that Seydoux would star in Bertrand Bonello's sci-fi melodrama The Beast (La Bête). In April 2021, Deadline reported that Seydoux would star alongside Kristen Stewart and Viggo Mortensen in David Cronenberg's sci-fi thriller Crimes of the Future. Seydoux said in the film, she plays a surgeon in a dystopian future "where people eat plastic." The film premiered in competition at the Cannes Film Festival in 2022. In June 2022, it was announced that Seydoux was cast as Lady Margot in Denis Villeneuve’s Dune: Part Two, which is scheduled for release in October 2023.

Other endeavours

Advertising campaigns and endorsements 
Seydoux has modelled for numerous magazines and brands, but sees herself "always as an actress", not as a model. She participated in the Levi's television advert "Dangerous Liaison", and has been seen in several photo editorials, including for Vogue Paris, American Vogue, Numéro, L'Officiel, CRASH, Another Magazine and W magazine. She fronted the 2013 campaign for French jewellery line Didier Dubot and appeared in Rag & Bone's Fall 2013 campaign with Michael Pitt.

She also appeared in a nude pictorial for French men's magazine Lui. In addition, Seydoux and her Blue Is the Warmest Colour co-star Adèle Exarchopoulos were featured in Miu Miu's 2014 resort ad campaign. Seydoux advertised for Prada's 2012 Resort line; and is the face of its 2013 campaign for the fragrances Prada Candy (shot by Jean-Paul Goude) and Prada Candy L'Eau (directed by Wes Anderson and Roman Coppola), and the 2014 campaign for Prada Candy Florale perfume.

Since 2016, she has been a brand ambassador for Louis Vuitton.

Personal life and public image
In September 2016, Seydoux announced that she and her boyfriend André Meyer were expecting their first child. On 18 January 2017, she gave birth to a son, Georges. She has said that the filming of Blue Is the Warmest Colour made her question her sexuality: "Of course I did [question it]. Me as a person, as a human being ... It's not nothing, making those scenes. Of course I question myself. But, I did not have any revelations."

In the wake of the Harvey Weinstein scandal and #MeToo in 2017, she accused Harvey Weinstein of sexual assault.

Seydoux has expressed a preference for defining herself by the term "actor" rather than "actress", saying: "I really don't feel like an actress, I feel like an actor."

In 2019, Reader’s Digest named her among some of the most amazing French actresses in film history. In 2020, Seydoux was included on Vogue’s list of "The most beautiful French actresses of all time." In 2022, she was made an Officer of the Legion of Honour by the French government.

Filmography

Film

Television

Video games

Accolades
In 2016, Seydoux was honoured with the Chevalier of the Order of Arts and Letters. In 2018, Seydoux was invited to join the Academy of Motion Picture Arts and Sciences.

References

External links

 
 
 
 Léa Seydoux at Agence Adéquat
 Léa Seydoux at Models.com

1985 births
21st-century French actresses
Actresses from Paris
Alsatian people
Best Actress Lumières Award winners
Chevaliers of the Ordre des Arts et des Lettres
Former Protestants
French female models
French film actresses
French people of German descent
Living people
Chopard Trophy for Female Revelation winners